Ronald Lowe (28 July 1905 – 29 August 1960) was an English cricketer. He played ten first-class matches for Surrey in 1923.

See also
 List of Surrey County Cricket Club players

References

External links
 

1905 births
1960 deaths
English cricketers
Surrey cricketers
People from Shepherd's Bush
Cricketers from Greater London